Gregory Kunde (February 24, 1954, Kankakee, Illinois) is an American operatic tenor particularly associated with the French and Italian repertoires.

Career
Kunde studied choral conducting and voice at Illinois State University before making his professional debut in 1978 at the Lyric Opera of Chicago, as Cassio in Otello, later singing Prunier in La rondine, and Vanya in Katya Kabanova. He appeared at the Opéra de Montréal as Tybalt in Roméo et Juliette, and as Arturo in I puritani, opposite Luciana Serra, which revealed his affinity for the bel canto repertory and his impressive upper register, reaching a high F (above the tenor high C) in falsettone. He made his debut at the Metropolitan Opera in New York as the understudy for the role of des Grieux in Massenet's Manon opposite soprano Catherine Malfitano in 1987, replacing the indisposed Dénes Gulyás for just one performance. He did not return to the Metropolitan Opera for another 13 years, where he was again stepping in for an indisposed colleague in one performance of their 2000 production of Rossini's La cenerentola–a procedure that would then become standard for Kunde's Metropolitan Opera career, replacing an ill colleague again in 2006 for their production of Bellini's I puritani opposite star soprano Anna Netrebko, and most recently in 2019 for their production of Saint-Saen's Samson et Dalila, a series of performances with which he received critical acclaim.

He won considerable acclaim in Europe in Les Huguenots, A Life for the Tsar, and Anna Bolena, and at the Pesaro Festival in 1992, as Idreno in Semiramide, and in 1993, as Rinaldo in Armida, opposite Renée Fleming.

Other notable roles include; Mitridate, re di Ponto, Rodrigo in La donna del lago, Arnold in Guillaume Tell, Ernesto in Don Pasquale, Nadir in Les pêcheurs de perles, Roméo in Roméo et Juliette, Enée in Les Troyens etc. 
In November 2012 he made an unexpected, successful debut as Verdi's Otello in Venice, becoming possibly the first tenor able to sing both Rossini's and Verdi' s version in the same year.
 
He can be heard on disc notably as Benvenuto Cellini, and as Gérald in Lakmé, opposite Natalie Dessay.

He resides in Rochester, New York, with his wife Linda, and his daughter Isabella.

Selected recordings
Hector Berlioz, Benvenuto Cellini, Gregory Kunde, Benvenuto Cellini, Patrizia Ciofi, Teresa, Laurent Naouri, Balducci, Joyce DiDonato, Ascanio, Jean-François Lapointe, Fieramosca, Renaud Délègue, Le Pape Clément VII, Choeur de Radio France, Orchestre National de France, conducted by John Nelson, 3 CD Erato Warner classics 2004

References

Sources
 Guide de l'opéra, Roland Mancini & Jean-Jacques Rouveroux, (Fayard, 1995)

External links

1954 births
Living people
American operatic tenors
Illinois State University alumni
People from Kankakee, Illinois
Singers from Illinois
Classical musicians from Illinois
20th-century American male opera singers
21st-century American male opera singers